Starship Troopers is an American military science fiction media franchise based on the 1959 novel of the same name by Robert A. Heinlein and the satirical 1997 film adaptation by screenwriter Edward Neumeier and director Paul Verhoeven.

Setting
The series is set hundreds of years in the future, after a collapse of Western democracy and many resulting wars. In this future, human society is now ruled by the Terran Federation, a government run by military veterans. Military service is voluntary, but required to earn the full rights of citizenship, such as holding office and voting.

Much of the series focuses on the experiences of Juan "Johnny" Rico and the lessons he learns enlisting in military service along with his hometown friends, Carmen Ibanez (a love interest who becomes a pilot) and Carl (who, in the films, is shown as being a psychic who joins military intelligence). Johnny joins the 'Mobile Infantry', the primary foot soldiers of the Federation (depicted in the book as having advanced armored suits equipped with jetpacks and nuclear weapons). While Johnny is in training, an alien species known as the "Arachnids" attacks Buenos Aires, resulting in the death of Johnny's family (only his mother in the books, his entire family in the film). After this, the Federation goes to war and the series follows their attempts to defeat the "bugs", especially by capturing part of the Arachnid ruling class.

Novel

Starship Troopers (1959)

At some point between 1958 and 1959, Robert Heinlein put aside the novel that would become Stranger in a Strange Land and wrote Starship Troopers. His motivation arose partially from his anger at US President Dwight Eisenhower's decision to suspend US nuclear tests, and the Soviet tests that occurred soon afterward. Writing in his 1980 volume Expanded Universe, Heinlein would say that the publication of a newspaper advertisement placed by the National Committee for a Sane Nuclear Policy on April 5, 1958, calling for a unilateral suspension of nuclear weapons testing by the United States sparked his desire to write Starship Troopers. Heinlein and his wife Virginia created the "Patrick Henry League" in an attempt to create support for the US nuclear testing program. Heinlein stated that he used the novel to clarify his military and political views.

Like many of Heinlein's books, Starship Troopers was completed in a few weeks. It was originally written as a juvenile novel for New York publishing house Scribner; Heinlein had previously had success with this format, having written several such novels published by Scribner. The manuscript was rejected, prompting Heinlein to end his association with the publisher completely, and resume writing books with adult themes. Scholars have suggested that Scribner's rejection was based on ideological objections to the content of the novel, particularly its treatment of military conflict.

The Magazine of Fantasy & Science Fiction first published Starship Troopers in October and November 1959 as a two-part serial titled Starship Soldier.

Commentators have written that Starship Troopers is not driven by its plot, though it contains scenes of military combat. Instead, much of the novel is given over to a discussion of ideas. In particular, the discussion of political views is a recurring feature of what scholar Jeffrey Cass described as an "ideologically intense" book. A 1997 review in Salon categorized it as a "philosophical novel". Critics have debated to what extent the novel promotes Heinlein's own political views. Some contend that the novel maintains a sense of irony that allows readers to draw their own conclusions; others argue that Heinlein is sermonizing throughout the book, and that its purpose is to expound Heinlein's militaristic philosophy.

Films

Live-action

Future
In December 2011, film producer Neal H. Moritz announced plans to produce a reboot of the Starship Troopers film franchise. In November 2016, Columbia and Moritz announced the writing team of Mark Swift and Damian Shannon had been signed to pen the screenplay. Verhoeven expressed skepticism at the proposed remake, citing reports that it draws heavily from the original militaristic 1959 novel.

Animated

Television

Cast and characters

 This table shows the principal characters and the actors who have portrayed them throughout the franchise.
 A dark grey cell indicates the character was not in the film or video game, or that the character's presence in the film or video game has not yet been announced.
 A  indicates a voice only role.

Reception

Critical and public response

References

External links
 starshiptroopers.com

 
Book franchises
Sony Pictures franchises
Military science fiction
Action film franchises
Horror film franchises